Maria Anna of Austria (Maria Anna Josepha Antonia Regina; 7 September 1683 – 14 August 1754) was Queen of Portugal as the wife of King John V of Portugal. She served as the regent of Portugal from 1742 until 1750 during the illness of her husband. She was born an Archduchess of Austria as the daughter of Leopold I, Holy Roman Emperor and Eleonore Magdalene of Neuburg.

Life

Early life 
Born Maria Anna Josepha Antonia Regina, she was the eleventh child and seventh daughter of Leopold I, Holy Roman Emperor (1640–1705) by his third wife, Eleonor Magdalene of Neuburg (1655–1720). Two of her brothers, Joseph and Charles later became emperors. Through Charles, she was an aunt of Maria Theresa, the only woman to ever rule the Habsburg dominions in her own right.

Life as queen consort
On 27 October 1708, Maria Anna married John V, King of Portugal (1689–1750) to seal the alliance between the two countries against France and Spain during the War of Spanish Succession. Maria Anna reformed the court and its customs to follow the traditions and customs of the traditional Queens of Portugal. Her greatest influence on the court and Portuguese nobility as a whole was the increase of segregation between men and women, as well as between servants and masters. Like John, Maria Anna had an exuberant taste, best shown in her famous parties: she would invite the nobility from all over the country and hold a magnificent festival, often lasting several days.

Regency 
In 1742 Maria Anna became regent after her husband had suffered a stroke and became partially paralyzed. When John V died on 31 July 1750, their eldest son Joseph I of Portugal inherited the throne.

She died in the Palace of Belém on 14 August 1754. After her death, she was buried in Lisbon, but her heart was brought to Vienna and buried there in the imperial crypt.

Issue
Maria Anna had six children with her husband, John V, King of Portugal, four of whom survived infancy.
 Infanta Barbara of Portugal (4 December 1711 – 27 August 1758), became Queen of Spain as the wife of Ferdinand VI of Spain (1713–1759).
 Infante Pedro of Portugal (19 October 1712 – 29 October 1714), Prince of Brazil, died in infancy.
 Joseph I of Portugal (6 June 1714 – 24 February 1777), married Mariana Victoria of Spain (1718–1781).
 Infante Carlos of Portugal (2 May 1716 – 30 March 1736), died before his parents.
 Peter III of Portugal (5 July 1717 – 25 May 1786), married his niece Maria I, Queen (regnant) of Portugal (1734–1816).
 Infante Alexandre of Portugal (24 September 1723 – 2 August 1728), died in infancy.

Ancestry

References

Bibliography

External links 

|-

1683 births
1754 deaths
18th-century viceregal rulers
Portuguese queens consort
Austrian princesses
18th-century House of Habsburg
Regents of Portugal
Queen mothers
Burials at the Monastery of São Vicente de Fora
Burials at the Imperial Crypt
House of Braganza
People from Linz
17th-century Austrian women
18th-century Austrian women
18th-century Portuguese people
18th-century Portuguese women
18th-century women rulers
Daughters of emperors
Royal reburials
Children of Leopold I, Holy Roman Emperor
Daughters of kings